Yannick Tifu (born October 12, 1984) is a Canadian professional ice hockey Centre who currently plays for the Watertown Wolves of the Federal Prospects Hockey League. Tifu is described as an agitator with scoring prowess.

Playing career
Prior to turning professional, Tifu played major junior hockey in the QMJHL with the Rouyn-Noranda Huskies.

Undrafted on August 14, 2008, the Dayton Bombers traded Tifu to the Florida Everblades for Jarret Lukin, Steve Czech, Mike McLean, and future considerations. After completion of his second season with the Elmira Jackals which included loan stints in the American Hockey League with the Binghamton Senators, Tifu signed as a free agent with the inaugural Chicago Express of the ECHL on October 7, 2011, despite considerable interest from Jackals rivals, the Reading Royals.

In the 2011–12 season, on November 28, 2011, and after only 17 games with the Express, Tifu was traded to the Reading Royals in exchange for Chad Painchaud. Tifu immediately established himself within the Royals and by March 2012, was selected as team Captain. He finished the season leading the team with 59 points in just 52 games before suffering a first round defeat.

Tifu was extended by the Royals to continue as captain in the 2012–13 season. He appeared as the only player to partake in every game for the Royals throughout the season, used as the team's primary offensive center. In leading the team in each offensive category with 27 goals, 45 assists and 72 points he became the third player in Royals history to reach the feat and the second to lead the Royals in consecutive seasons. In the post-season, Tifu completed what is considered as the best individual season by any Royals player, by leading the league with 12 goals and 25 points to help capture the Royals first Kelly Cup. Selected as both the Team and Fans MVP, Tifu was the first player re-signed to a contract for the following season on July 4, 2013.

After three seasons with the Royals, Tifu signed abroad in agreeing to a one-year contract with French club, Ducs d'Angers of the Ligue Magnus on June 10, 2014. In his only season with the club, Tifu adapted quickly to an elite status in France contributing with 35 points in just 26 games.

In the off-season returned to the ECHL in signing a contract with the Brampton Beast on July 29, 2015. In the 2015–16 season, Tifu appeared in 5 games with the Beast, and recorded his 500th ECHL point before he was traded in a return to the Reading Royals on October 28, 2015.

From 2016-2021, Tifu played for Saint-Georges Cool FM 103.5 and of the Ligue Nord-Américaine de Hockey. However, due to the restrictions of attendance and the league stopping in December 2021 because of COVID-19, Tifu joined the Watertown Wolves of the Federal Prospects Hockey League at the beginning of 2022.

Personal life
While still playing in Saint-Georges, Yannick Tifu is now the store director of Canada's largest hockey store HockeySupremacy.com since 2017.

Career statistics

References

External links

1984 births
Living people
Albany River Rats players
Binghamton Senators players
Brampton Beast players
Canadian ice hockey centres
Chicago Express players
Dayton Bombers players
Ducs d'Angers players
Elmira Jackals (ECHL) players
Florida Everblades players
Ice hockey people from Quebec
Phoenix RoadRunners players
Reading Royals players
Rochester Americans players
Rockford IceHogs (UHL) players
Rouyn-Noranda Huskies players
Saint-Georges Cool FM 103.5 players
Victoria Salmon Kings players
Canadian people of Romanian descent
People from Brossard
Canadian expatriate ice hockey players in France
Canadian expatriate ice hockey players in the United States